Customer proprietary network information (CPNI) is the data collected by telecommunications companies about a consumer's telephone calls. It includes the time, date, duration and destination number of each call, the type of network a consumer subscribes to, and any other information that appears on the consumer's telephone bill.

Telemarketers or customer service agents working on behalf of telephone companies must go through an additional customer authentication layer (typically a PIN, or last four of the stored payment method) and ask for the customer's consent prior to accessing the billing information or before using or sharing that information for any purpose, including but not limited to, offering an up-sell or any change of services. Usually, this is done at the beginning of a call from the telemarketer to the telephone subscriber.

Description 
The U.S. Telecommunications Act of 1996 granted the Federal Communications Commission (FCC) authority to regulate how customer proprietary network information (CPNI) can be used and to enforce related consumer information privacy provisions. The rules in the 2007 FCC CPNI Order further restrict CPNI use and created new notification and reporting requirements.

The rules in the 2007 CPNI Order include:
 Limits the information which carriers may provide to third-party marketing firms without first securing the affirmative consent of their customers
 Defines when and how customer service representatives may share call details
 Creates new notification and reporting obligations for carriers (including identity verification procedures)
 Verification process must MATCH what is shown with the company placing the call. 

Note that as long as an affiliate is "communications" related, the FCC has ruled that CPNI is under an opt-out approach (can be shared without your explicit permission). A phone company is permitted to sell all information on you, such as numbers you call, when you called them, where you were when you called them, or any other personally identifying information. CPNI would normally require a warrant for law enforcement agencies, but it can be freely sold to "communications" related companies. One can verify this by checking rule 64.2007(b)(1) and footnote 137 in the 2007 CPNI order. One can call up a phone company and opt out by requesting that they do not share CPNI information. In the case of Verizon Wireless, for example, the company states that on the one hand, "Your privacy is an important priority at Verizon Wireless", and on the other hand, states that Verizon shares CPNI "among our affiliates and parent companies (including Vodafone) and their subsidiaries unless you advise us not to". and states that it shares "URLs (such as search terms) of websites you visit when you use our wireless service, the location of your device ("location information"), and your use of [Application software [applications] and features" as well as other "information about your use of Verizon products and services (such as data and calling features, device type, and amount of use), as well as demographic and interest categories (such as gender, age range, sports fan, frequent diner, or pet owner)" with other non-affiliated companies, and does allow customers to request that such sharing not be done via an online form, and it is unclear whether Verizon considers some or all such "online" requests to be about CPNI or as legally binding as "call-based" requests about CPNI.

The 2007 CPNI Order does not revise all CPNI rules.  For example, the rule revisions adopted in the Order do not limit a carrier's ability to use CPNI to perform billing and collections functions, restrict CPNI use to effect maintenance and repair activity, or impact responses to lawful subpoenas.

Fines for failure to comply with CPNI rules can be substantial. Since 2006, the FCC, focusing on one rule regarding internal annual compliance certificates, proposed over $1 million in fines and those fines are not necessarily indicative of the fines the FCC could propose. The FCC is authorized to impose fines of up to $150,000 for each rule violation or each day of a continuing violation up to a maximum of $1.5 million for each continuing violation. The rules adopted in the Order are effective either six months after the Order is published in the Federal Register or on receipt of Office of Management and Budget approval of the new rules depending on which event is later.  (Order at ¶61)

See also
 Call detail record
 Electronic Communications Privacy Act (ECPA)
 Internet Protocol Detail Record
 Mobile identity management
 Pen register
 Telecommunications data retention

References
 6389881560

External links 
 CPNI Information
 FCC What Your Telephone Company Knows About You (And Controlling How They Use It)
 FCC CPNI Order - April 2, 2007
 www.fcc.gov - Protecting Your Telephone Calling Records

Telemarketing
Telephony
Telecommunications economics
Privacy of telecommunications